Éric Louvel (born 31 May 1962) is a French former professional racing cyclist. He rode in the 1986 Tour de France and the 1985 Vuelta a España. He also competed in three events at the 1984 Summer Olympics.

References

External links
 

1962 births
Living people
French male cyclists
Sportspeople from Dieppe, Seine-Maritime
Cyclists at the 1984 Summer Olympics
Olympic cyclists of France
French track cyclists
Cyclists from Normandy